The following lists events that happened during 2007 in the Democratic Republic of the Congo.

Incumbents 
 President: Joseph Kabila
 Prime Minister: Antoine Gizenga

Events
Glencore acquires 50% of SAMREF Congo SPRL in 2007, a Congolese-registered subsidiary of Saudi Aramco Mobil Refinery (Samref Overseas S.A.), registered in Panama, that owns 80% of the Mutanda Mine. Global Witness raised concerns with this transaction and two others, saying that the secrecy that surrounded them raised questions about corruption.

January
 A World Bank review of the Congo's three largest mining contracts finds that the 2005 concession awards were made with "a complete lack of transparency"

March
 March 24 - At least 150 people die in Kinshasa in fighting between the military and forces loyal to Senator Jean-Pierre Bemba.

May
 May 28 - Aid workers claim that at least 17 people have been killed and others abducted by Hutu rebels in the Democratic Republic of the Congo.

July
July 12 - Red Cross says thousands of displaced Tutsis in the militias' path.

December
Copper production operations resume at Katanga Mining's Luilu Metallurgical Plant after an extensive restoration program.

References

 
2000s in the Democratic Republic of the Congo
Years of the 21st century in the Democratic Republic of the Congo
Democratic Republic of the Congo
Democratic Republic of the Congo